Thongchai or Tongchai are romanizations of two homophonous Thai names,  and . Both are masculine given names, and also a surname.

Given name
People with the given name Thongchai include:
 Thongchai Akkarapong, footballer
 Thongchai Jaidee, golfer
 Thongchai Sitsongpeenong, Muay Thai boxer
 Thongchai Sukkoki, footballer
 Thongchai Winichakul, historian
 Tongchai Teptani, boxer

People with the given name Thongchai include:
 Thongchai McIntyre, singer
 Thongchai Rathchai, footballer

Surname
People with the surname Thongchai include:
 Suradech Thongchai, footballer

People with the surname Thongchai include:
 Pipob Thongchai, political activist

Thai masculine given names
Thai-language surnames